Eugene Park, better known as Pobelter, is an American professional League of Legends player who was formerly the mid laner for Counter Logic Gaming. He is a three-time champion of the LCS and has made four major international appearances.

Early life 
Pobelter has an older sister. He attended Troy High School in Fullerton, California. He tested into the school as he was an out-of-district student, and studied computer science in the Troy Tech magnet program. Pobelter initially played League of Legends as a hobby during high school.

Career 
Pobelter played on Team Curse, and eventually moved to Winterfox, a team largely perceived as being built around him. After Winterfox's loss in the relegation tournament after the Spring 2015 season, Pobelter abandoned the team and moved to Counter Logic Gaming, which proceeded to win the Summer 2015 Split. CLG then elected to play Huhi as their mid laner, prompting Pobelter to move to Immortals, which had highly successful regular seasons in 2016 but strangely failed in playoffs, losing 0–3 to TSM in the semifinals of the NA LCS Spring Split playoffs in April, and losing 2–3 to Cloud9 in the summer seminals. They finished third in the 2016 Spring NA LCS, beating Team Liquid 3–0 in the third-place decider match. After Immortals were removed from the LCS in the 2018 season, Pobelter joined the successful Team Liquid. In 2019, Team Liquid replaced Pobelter with Jensen, and Pobelter went to Flyquest. Flyquest was reasonably successful in 2019 Spring, finishing fourth, but placed ninth in the Summer split. Flyquest announced that they had hired Tristran "PowerOfEvil" Schrage as their midlaner for 2020; Pobelter wrote in November 2019 that he had not been picked up by any team for a starting position in 2020.  Unable to find a position, Pobelter coached for Team Liquid during the first half of the 2020 Spring Split, but eventually returned to Counter Logic Gaming's as their midlaner. On August 5, 2020, he was optioned to CLG's academy team.

Tournament results

References 

Team Curse players
Winterfox players
Evil Geniuses players
Counter Logic Gaming players
Immortals (esports) players
Living people
People from Fullerton, California
American people of Korean descent
Curse Academy players
Team Liquid players
Twitch (service) streamers
American esports players
Year of birth missing (living people)